Gunnera magnifica, commonly called hoja de pantano, is a large herbaceous shrub or tree-like plant native to the  montane rainforests of the Colombian Andes in Caldas Province. It can grow as high as  The lower trunk is decumbent and rhizomatous, while the upper trunk is upright and palm-like.

References

magnifica